The 1973 Vanderbilt Commodores football team represented Vanderbilt University in the 1973 NCAA Division I football season. The Commodores were led by head coach Steve Sloan in his first season and finished the season with a record of five wins and six losses (5–6 overall, 1–5 in the SEC).

Schedule

Source: 1973 Vanderbilt football schedule

References

Vanderbilt
Vanderbilt Commodores football seasons
Vanderbilt Commodores football